Scobicia is a genus of horned powder-post beetles in the family Bostrichidae. There are about 11 described species in Scobicia.

Species
These 11 species belong to the genus Scobicia:
 Scobicia arizonica Lesne, 1907
 Scobicia barbata (Wollaston, 1860)
 Scobicia barbifrons (Wollaston, 1864)
 Scobicia bidentata (Horn, 1878)
 Scobicia chevrieri (Villa & Villa, 1835)
 Scobicia declivis (LeConte, 1860) (lead cable borer)
 Scobicia ficicola (Wollaston, 1865)
 Scobicia lesnei Fisher, 1950
 Scobicia monticola Fisher, 1950
 Scobicia pustulata (Fabricius, 1801)
 Scobicia suturalis (Horn, 1878)

References

Further reading

External links

 

Bostrichidae
Articles created by Qbugbot